The 2011 UK Open Qualifier 2 was the second of eight 2011 UK Open Darts Qualifiers which was held at the Metrodome in Barnsley on Sunday 27 February.

Prize money

Draw

References

2